James Ross Binkley (December 3, 1883 – April 23, 1915) was a Canadian football player, coach, and manager who was the Head Coach of the Toronto Argonauts in 1913. He was their team captain from 1910 to 1913.

Early life
Ross Binkley was born on December 3, 1883 in Dundas, Ontario.

Professional career

Dundas Rugby Team
He started his career with the Dundas Rugby Team in 1907. He was team captain as they won the Intermediate Dominion Championship in 1907.

Toronto Argonauts
In 1910 he became the team captain for the Toronto Argonauts. He was their general manager in the next few years and their coach in 1913. He stopped after 1914.

Death
Binkley was killed in action on April 23, 1915 at the age of 31 in France. He was reportedly "blown to pieces" while operating a machine gun.

References

Further reading

1883 births
1915 deaths
Toronto Argonauts coaches
Toronto Argonauts players
Players of Canadian football from Ontario
People from Dundas, Ontario
Sportspeople from Hamilton, Ontario
Canadian Expeditionary Force soldiers
Canadian military personnel killed in World War I
Canadian military personnel from Ontario
Canadian Army soldiers